Hadji Muhtamad, officially the Municipality of Hadji Muhtamad (Tausūg: Lupah Hadji Muhtamad; Chavacano: Municipalidad de Hadji Muhtamad), is a  municipality in the province of Basilan, Philippines. According to the 2020 census, it has a population of 26,867 people.

Hadji Muhtamad was created out of the 10 barangays of Lantawan that were not on Basilan Island, through Muslim Mindanao Autonomy Act No. 200, which was subsequently ratified in a plebiscite held on August 25, 2007.

Geography
Its territory includes the Pilas Islands and surrounding islets, west of Basilan Island.

Barangays
Hadji Muhtamad is politically subdivided into 10 barangays.

Climate

Demographics

In the 2020 census, Hadji Muhtamad had a population of 26,867.

Economy

References

External links
Hadji Muhtamad Profile at the DTI Cities and Municipalities Competitive Index
[ Philippine Standard Geographic Code]

Municipalities of Basilan
Island municipalities in the Philippines